Enter the Dragon / Open the Historic Gate is the first professional wrestling pay-per-view (PPV) event produced by Dragon Gate USA that was taped on July 25, 2009 at The Arena in Philadelphia, Pennsylvania and aired September 4, 2009.

Enter the Dragon was awarded Best Major Show of 2009 by Wrestling Observer Newsletter.

Background
Enter the Dragon featured five professional wrestling matches that involved different wrestlers from pre-existing scripted feuds and storylines. Wrestlers were portrayed as either villains or heroes in the scripted events that build tension and culminated into a wrestling match or series of matches.

Results

2009

2010

2011

References
General

Specific

External links
DGUSA.tv

Dragon Gate USA shows
2009 in professional wrestling
2010 in professional wrestling
2011 in professional wrestling
Events in Philadelphia
Professional wrestling in Philadelphia
Professional wrestling in New York City
Events in New York City
2009 in Pennsylvania
2010 in Pennsylvania
2011 in New York City